Phon Thong railway station is a railway station located in Takhli Subdistrict, Takhli District, Nakhon Sawan, Thailand. It is located 188.650 km from Bangkok railway station and is a class 2 railway station. It is on the Northern Line of the State Railway of Thailand. Some freight services operate from this station as the station is located adjacent to the Chonlaprathan Cement Factory.

Train services
 Ordinary 202 Phitsanulok-Bangkok
 Ordinary 207/208 Bangkok-Nakhon Sawan-Bangkok
 Ordinary 209/210 Bangkok-Ban Takhli-Bangkok
 Ordinary 211/212 Bangkok-Taphan Hin-Bangkok
 Local 401/402 Lop Buri-Phitsanulok-Lop Buri

References
 Ichirō, Kakizaki (2010). Ōkoku no tetsuro: tai tetsudō no rekishi. Kyōto: Kyōtodaigakugakujutsushuppankai. 
 Otohiro, Watanabe (2013). Tai kokutetsu yonsenkiro no tabi: shasō fūkei kanzen kiroku. Tōkyō: Bungeisha. 

Railway stations in Thailand